Isaac Henry Manders (11 July 1829 – 5 January 1891) was a New Zealand politician who was a Member of Parliament in the Otago region.

Manders was born in England and baptised in Finsbury, London. He lived in Australia in the 1850s and 1860s with his wife, Dorothea Coleman Hyde. Their son Thomas Charles (born and died in 1854) was born in Kilmore, Victoria, followed by the birth of their daughter, Dorothea Charlotte (later McJunkin; 1856–1924) in Prahran, Victoria and their son Theodore Richard (1862–63) in Geelong, Victoria.

He was descended from the wealthy Manders of Dublin, born in London, and educated at Rugby School. He had been on the Otago Provincial Council, and employed by local councils.

He died in Queenstown aged 62 One report said his abilities were "misdirected" and he had been "on the spree".

References

1829 births
1891 deaths
People from Clerkenwell
English emigrants to Australia
English emigrants to New Zealand
Members of the New Zealand House of Representatives
New Zealand MPs for South Island electorates
19th-century New Zealand politicians
Unsuccessful candidates in the 1866 New Zealand general election
Unsuccessful candidates in the 1879 New Zealand general election
People educated at Rugby School